Prem Khandu Thungon (born 5 June 1946) is an Indian politician and leader of the Indian National Congress. He was a former central minister of state for Urban Development in the Government of India. He was the Chief Minister of Janata Party led Arunachal Pradesh Government following the first assembly elections held in 1978. He was convicted in 2015 of misappropriating public funds intended for an irrigation project in Nagaland, and sentenced him to 4 years in jail.

References

Chief Ministers of Arunachal Pradesh
Living people
India MPs 1980–1984
India MPs 1984–1989
India MPs 1989–1991
India MPs 1991–1996
Lok Sabha members from Arunachal Pradesh
People from Bomdila
People from West Kameng district
Chief ministers from Janata Party
Indian politicians convicted of crimes
Indian prisoners and detainees
Janata Party politicians
1946 births